Stare Miasto ("Old Town") is one of the five former administrative boroughs of Wrocław, Poland, comprising the oldest parts of the city. Its functions were largely taken over on 8 March 1990 by the Municipal Office of the newly established Wrocław Municipality. The name Stare Miasto remained in use, mainly for statistical and administrative purposes.

The district is bordered by the right bank of the Oder River, the former course of the Oława River, the eastern section of the City Moat, Dworcowa Street and the railway line from the Central Station towards Poznań. The district includes the following settlements: Stare Miasto (including the historic New Town), Przedmieście Świdnickie and Szczepin.

See also
Districts of Wrocław

References

Districts of Wrocław